Pangea Recordings is an electronic music record label that has featured releases from artists such as Joshua Collins, Chris Lake, Andy Moor, Mick Wilson, Nine Below Zero, and Subsky. They currently have two sublabels, 1 Shot Recordings and Pangea UK.

See also
 List of record labels

External links

American record labels
Record labels established in 2001
Electronic music record labels